Lansing Delta Township Assembly (GM LDT) is a General Motors automobile assembly factory in Delta Township, Michigan on land that is shared by the township and the nearby city of Lansing. It manufactures Chevrolet, and Buick vehicles.

Completed in 2006, the factory measures  in size, and employed 3,634 hourly workers, and 262 salaried workers as of 2010.  The adjacent Lansing Regional Stamping employed 243 hourly workers, and 17 salary workers for a total of 4,156 workers in the factory complex.  Its workers are represented by UAW 602 and 652, respectively, and assumed operations of the former Lansing Metal Center and the Lansing Craft Centre when they closed.

"Green" factory
Lansing Delta Township Assembly is a LEED gold-certified automobile plant.

Environmental features of the factory include:
 a roof drain system which catches rain water and diverts to cisterns stored above the factory's restrooms, which is then used to flush toilets.
 having 25% of the plant's construction materials composed of recycled materials.
 leaving 50% of the site undeveloped
 a 20% reduction in energy used for lighting the plant by lowering overall lighting in areas such as aisles.
 the elimination of ozone-depleting substances used in any of the building’s heating and cooling, refrigeration, and fire suppression systems.

The factory grounds also contain a  wildlife area managed by the factory's Wildlife Habitat Team, who also hosts wildlife educational events for local community groups and schools.

Vehicles produced

Current  
As of September, 2022:
 Buick Enclave: 2007–present 
 Chevrolet Traverse: 2009–present

Past 
GMC Acadia: 2009–2016
Saturn Outlook: 2007–2010

References

External links
 

General Motors factories
Economy of Lansing, Michigan
Motor vehicle assembly plants in Michigan
Buildings and structures in Eaton County, Michigan
Buildings and structures in Lansing, Michigan
2006 establishments in Michigan